The 2002 Idaho Vandals football team represented the University of Idaho during the 2002 NCAA Division I-A football season. Idaho was a football-only member of the Sun Belt Conference, and played their home games in the Kibbie Dome, an indoor facility on campus in Moscow. The Vandals' head coach was alumnus Tom Cable, in his third season, and Idaho was  overall,  in conference.

Schedule

Roster

References

External links
Gem of the Mountains: 2003 University of Idaho yearbook – 2002 football season
Idaho Argonaut – student newspaper – 2002 editions

Idaho
Idaho Vandals football seasons
Idaho Vandals football